Herman Baron de Gaiffier d'Hestroy (18 May 1895 - 20 October 1960) was a Belgian horse rider who competed in the 1920 Summer Olympics. In 1920 he and his horse Miss won the silver medal in the team jumping competition.

References

External links 
 profile

1895 births
1960 deaths
Belgian male equestrians
Belgian show jumping riders
Olympic equestrians of Belgium
Equestrians at the 1920 Summer Olympics
Olympic silver medalists for Belgium
Olympic medalists in equestrian
Medalists at the 1920 Summer Olympics